The Good Bad Guy is a 1997 Italian-American comedy film directed by Ezio Greggio.

Plot

Cast
Ezio Greggio as Joe Fortunato
Jessica Lundy as Carol Graham
Rudy De Luca as Vince
Carmine Caridi as Tony Fusciacca
Dom DeLuise as the Judge
Ron Carey as Robert Lambert
Pat Asanti as Sergeant O'Neill
Ronnie Schell as Chief Harrison
Carol Arthur as Liza
Adam Tomei as a policeman
Jack Carter as a driver
Alissa A. Nichols as a girl

Reception
The film opened on 58 screens in Italy and grossed $323,173 for the weekend, ranking seventh at the Italian box office.

References

External links

1997 films
Films directed by Ezio Greggio
Films set in Los Angeles
1997 multilingual films
Films set in New York City
English-language Italian films
1990s Italian-language films
1997 comedy films
American comedy films
Italian comedy films
Italian multilingual films
American multilingual films
Films with screenplays by Rudy De Luca
1990s American films
1990s Italian films